Pratikno (born 13 February 1962) is an Indonesian politician and academician. He is currently the Minister of State Secretariat of Indonesia in the Onward Indonesia Cabinet, the cabinet appointed by President Joko Widodo for his second term in office 2019-2024.

Pratikno was formerly Dean of the Faculty of Social and Political Science at Gadjah Mada University in Yogyakarta, Indonesia, before becoming Rektor of the University in 2012.  He resigned as Rektor on being appointed State Secretary in the first Joko Widodo administration in 2014.

Early life
Born at Bojonegoro in East Java, Pratikno graduated from Gadjah Mada University in 1985 where he studied public administration. He then received a Master's degree in Development Administration from Birmingham University and Doctoral degree from the Department of Asian Studies, Flinders University, in Adelaide, South Australia.

References

1962 births
Government ministers of Indonesia
Indonesian Muslims
Gadjah Mada University alumni
Alumni of the University of Birmingham
Flinders University alumni
Academic staff of Gadjah Mada University
Javanese people
Living people
Politicians from East Java
People from Bojonegoro Regency
Working Cabinet (Joko Widodo)
Onward Indonesia Cabinet